At Home in Mitford is a novel written by American author Jan Karon.  It is book one of The Mitford Years series.  The first edition was published in hardcover format by Doubleday in 1994.  Penguin Books published the paperback edition in 1996.

The novel was adapted into a 2017 television film airing on the Hallmark Channel.

List of characters
 Father Tim
 Cynthia Coppersmith
 Miss Sadie Baxter
 Barnabas
 Dooley Barlowe
 Hoppy Harper
 Miss Rose
 Uncle Billy
 Emma Garrett
 Hal Owens
 Marge Owens
 Olivia Davenport
Percy Moseley
Velma Moseley
Mule Skinner

References

External links
 *The Mitford Years official website

1994 American novels
Novels by Jan Karon
Doubleday (publisher) books
Novels set in North Carolina